was a sail-and-steam corvette of the early Imperial Japanese Navy. Although the name Kaimon translates to "sea gate", the ship was named for Mount Kaimon, although written with different kanji, located in Kagoshima prefecture.

Background
Kaimon was a three-masted bark-rigged sloop-of-war with a coal-fired double expansion reciprocating steam engine with four boilers driving a single screw. She was laid down at the Yokosuka Naval Arsenal on 1 September 1877, launched on 28 August 1882 and commissioned on 13 March 1884. Her construction required over six years, due to numerous technical issues and problems with funding.

The design of Kaimon was almost identical to the corvette , completed a year later at the Yokosuka Naval Arsenal. Both ships were designed by French foreign advisors to the early Meiji government in the employ of the Yokosuka Naval Arsenal.
During her launching ceremony, a flock of white doves (the traditional messengers of the war god Hachiman) was released, setting a precedent for all future launchings of Japanese warships. Her first captain was Lieutenant Commander Tsuboi Kōzō.

Operational history
Kaimon saw combat service in the First Sino-Japanese War, at the landings of Japanese forces at Chemulpo in Korea, and subsequently at the Battle of Yalu River under the command of Lieutenant Commander Sakurai Kikunozo. She also served with the Japanese task force that supported the invasion of Taiwan in 1895.

On 21 March 1898, Kaimon was re-designated as a third-class coastal defense ship, and was used for coastal survey and patrol duties.

During the Russo-Japanese War, Kaimon was assigned to patrol duties between the Korean Peninsula and Tsushima Strait. She was also used as a transport. She struck a naval mine on 5 July 1904, off Port Arthur, and sunk with the loss of her captain and 22 crewmen. She was struck from the navy list on 21 May 1905.

Notes

References
 Corbett, Sir Julian. Maritime Operations in The Russo-Japanese War 1904-1905. (1994) Originally classified, and in two volumes, 
Chesneau, Roger and Eugene M. Kolesnik (editors), All The World's Fighting Ships 1860-1905, Conway Maritime Press, 1979 reprinted 2002, 

Screw sloops of the Imperial Japanese Navy
1882 ships
Naval ships of Japan
First Sino-Japanese War naval ships of Japan
Russo-Japanese War naval ships of Japan
Three-masted ships
Ships built by Yokosuka Naval Arsenal
Maritime incidents in 1904
Shipwrecks in the Yellow Sea
Shipwrecks of the Russo-Japanese War
Ships sunk by mines